The Atlantic ghost crab, Ocypode quadrata, is a species of ghost crab. It is a common species along the Atlantic coast of the United States, where it is the only species of ghost crab; its range of distribution extends from its northernmost reach on beaches in Westport, Massachusetts, south along the coasts of the tropical Western Atlantic Ocean to the beach of Barra do Chui, in Rio Grande do Sul in southern Brazil.

Description
They must return to water periodically to moisten their gills, and when larvae must be released into the sea, but are otherwise terrestrial. Their stalked compound eyes can swivel to give them 360° vision. Young crabs are cryptically colored to blend in with their sandy habitats.

Distribution
Atlantic ghost crabs are found from Santa Catarina north to Massachusetts, USA. They have been recorded in Block Island, Rhode Island, Nantucket, Massachusetts, Martha's Vineyard, Massachusetts, northern Virginia beaches, the Outer Banks of North Carolina to Santa Catarina, Brazil, on Fernando de Noronha, and Bermuda. Its planktonic larvae have been documented in Woods Hole, Massachusetts, although the adults have not been recorded at this location.

Fossil record
Fossil specimens of O. quadrata have been found in rocks dating from the Pleistocene.

Ecology

The Atlantic ghost crab lives in burrows in sand above the strandline.

This crab can produce a variety of sounds by striking the ground with the claw, by stridulation with the legs, and an incompletely explained "bubbling sound". Males compete in a heavily ritualised manner which prevents the need for physical contact.

O. quadrata is more active at night than in the day, and is an omnivore, eating clams (such as conquina clams and Donax spp.), mole crabs (including Emerita talpoida), insects, plant material, detritus, and even other crabs. They also feed on the eggs and hatchlings of sea turtles, such as the loggerhead sea turtle.

Sandy beaches, a habitat frequented by ghost crabs, have had a decrease in the abundance of ghost crabs due to human behavior. Ghost crabs are negatively impacted by human and vehicle trampling, which results in direct crushing of crabs, as well as indirect damage such as compression of sediment which reduces habitat suitability, interference with reproductive behaviors, reduction in food supply, and light pollution. Consequently, it is less common on beaches frequented by people.

References

External links

Atlantic ghost crab
Atlantic ghost crab
Fauna of Bermuda
Fauna of the Eastern United States
Arthropods of the Dominican Republic
Crustaceans described in 1787